Moreyra is a surname. Notable people with the surname include:

Eugênia Álvaro Moreyra (1898–1948), Brazilian journalist, actress, and theater director
Julio Moreyra (born 1981), Argentine footballer